Walnut Street Bridge, located in Philadelphia, Pennsylvania, crosses the Schuylkill River between Center City and West Philadelphia. The bridge carries Walnut Street across the Schuylkill River.

History

Walnut Street Bridge was built originally in 1893. After falling into a state of disrepair in the late 20th century, it was rebuilt in 1990. In 2012, the bridge was adjusted again to become a 3-lane bridge with 12-feet-wide (3.7m) foot paths, and a bike lane. 

The original 1893 bridge was a  concrete structure with three steel Pratt trusses mounted on four heavy oblong concrete abutments and piers. It was demolished in 1988, but its piers were used for the -wide 1991 span.

See also
List of crossings of the Schuylkill River

References

1991 establishments in Pennsylvania
Bridges in Philadelphia
Bridges completed in 1893
Bridges completed in 1991
Road bridges in Pennsylvania
Bridges over the Schuylkill River
Steel bridges in the United States